The  was a socialist and progressive political party in Japan that existed from 1945 to 1996. The party was founded as the Social Democratic Party of Japan by members of several proletarian parties that existed before World War II, including the Social Mass Party, the Labour-Farmer Party, and the Japan Labour-Farmer Party. The party represented the Japanese left after the war, and was a major opponent of the right-wing Liberal Democratic Party.

The JSP was briefly in power from 1947 to 1948. From 1951 to 1955, the JSP was divided into the Left Socialist Party and the Right Socialist Party. In 1955, Japan's two major conservative parties merged to form the Liberal Democratic Party (LDP), establishing the so-called 1955 System, which allowed the party to continuously hold power since. The JSP was the largest opposition party but was incapable of forming government. Nonetheless, the JSP managed to hold about one third of the seats in the National Diet during this period, preventing the LDP from revising the Constitution of Japan.

In the late 1980s and early 1990s, the JSP under the leadership of Takako Doi earned a record-high number of seats. However, the establishment and electoral success of new conservative parties in the mid-1990s took the JSP by surprise and its share of seats in the National Diet decreased significantly. The party was formally dissolved in 1996. Its successor is the Social Democratic Party, a minor party holding two parliamentary seats, one each in the Houses of Representatives and Councillors as of 2022.

Two Japanese prime ministers, Tetsu Katayama and Tomiichi Murayama, were members of the JSP.

History

1940s 

Socialist parties have been active in Japan under various names since the early 20th century, often suffering harsh government repression as well as ideological dissensions and splits. The party was originally known as the Social Democratic Party of Japan (SDPJ) in English and was formed in 1945 following the fall of the militarist regime that had led Japan into World War II. Shortly after the party's founding, a left faction within the SDPJ proposed that the official name of the party in English be changed to the Japanese Socialist Party (JSP). A right faction consisting of social democrats opposed this proposal, but the internal motion to change the party's name was ultimately adopted.

The party became the largest political party in the first general election under the Constitution of Japan in 1947 (143 of 466 seats) and a government was formed by Tetsu Katayama, forming a coalition with the Democratic Party and the Citizens' Cooperation Party. Katayama's coalition fell in February 1948, in large part due to inexperience and subsequent poor performance in leading government. Hitoshi Ashida succeeded Katayama as prime minister of a new coalition with the Democrats. In October 1948, just seven months after taking office, Ashida resigned due to his alleged involvement in the Showa Denko corruption scandal. In 1958, he was acquitted of all charges. The confusion and disarray caused by the corruption scandal were part of what allowed Shigeru Yoshida and the Liberal Party to return to government.

In the period following the end of World War II, the JSP played a key role in the drafting of the new Japanese constitution, adding progressive articles related to issues such as health, welfare and working conditions. Unfortunately for the JSP and the broader Japanese left in the immediate postwar era, their time in power coincided with a change in U.S. policy towards Japan commonly known as the Reverse Course. Beginning around 1947, and intensifying with the victory of the Communists over the Nationalists in the Chinese Civil War in 1949, the U.S. occupation government headed by Douglas MacArthur felt the need to revise its previously conciliatory stance towards the kinds of policies pursued by Japanese leftists, from the breakup of Zaibatsu, the country's business conglomerates, to land reform, to the ousting of nationalist figures in government. Apart from reversing early steps taken towards implementing these policies, the U.S. occupation government oversaw and assisted in the purging of almost 30,000 workers deemed to be "red" between 1948 and 1950, frustrating leftist attempts to hold on to state power.

1950s
The Showa Denko scandal not only brought the downfall of the cabinet, but also led to an acrimonious schism between the left and right halves of the Socialist Party amid mutual recriminations, as one of the main targets of the investigation had been Right Socialist faction leader Suehiro Nishio. Finally in 1951, the JSP split into the Right Socialist Party, consisting of more centrist socialists who leaned toward social democracy; and the Left Socialist Party, formed by orthodox Marxists favoring a socialist revolution. Both parties claimed to be the true Socialist Party of Japan and refused to recognize the legitimacies of their rivals. The faction farthest to the left formed a small independent party, the Worker-Farmers Party, espousing Maoism from 1948 until it rejoined the JSP in 1957.

In 1955, the two splinter parties begrudgingly set aside their differences and re-merged. This was a "shotgun wedding" of sorts that happened under duress as it became increasingly clear that all of the conservative parties, with U.S. backing, were in the process of merging to form what would become the Liberal Democratic Party (LDP), although the JSP actually merged a few months before the conservatives. The intra-party animosities did not fully subside, and the party remained riven by ideological factions organized according to left–right spectrum, as opposed to what the JSP called the "feudal personalism" of the more conservative party factions. Nevertheless, for a time the newly re-merged party found increasing success at the ballot box. Throughout the 1950s, the party made new gains in the Lower House in every single election, culminating in the 1958 Japanese general election, in which the party garnered an impressive 33.1 percent of the popular vote and 167 out of 467 seats. This was sufficient to block the attempts of conservative Prime Minister Kishi Nobusuke to revise the Constitution of Japan in order to eliminate the anti-war "Peace Clause" in Article 9 of the Japanese Constitution. By the end of the 1950s, a narrative emerged in the media that the Socialist Party would eventually gain a majority due to ongoing social trends such as increasing urbanization and industrialization.

1960s

The party split again in 1960 because of internal disagreement over how to conduct the ongoing Anpo protests against revision of the Treaty of Mutual Cooperation and Security Between the United States and Japan, known as Anpo in Japanese, and whether or not to cooperate with the Communist Party of Japan in doing so. On 24 January 1960, the right-most elements of the party led by Suehiro Nishio (a part of the old Right Socialist Party of Japan), broke away to form the Democratic Socialist Party, leaving the JSP slightly weakened.

A further blow came in the fall of 1960 when the energetic JSP party chairman Inejiro Asanuma was assassinated by a right-wing youth, Otoya Yamaguchi, during a televised election debate. Asanuma had been a charismatic figure who had been able to hold the antagonistic left and right factions of the party together through the force of his personality. Asanuma's untimely death deprived the party of his adroit leadership, and thrust Saburō Eda into the leadership role instead. A centrist, Eda rapidly took the party in a more centrist direction, far faster than the left socialists were ready to accept. This led to growing infighting within the party, and drastically damaged its ability to present a cohesive message to the public.

In particular, Eda earned the enmity of the party's left-wing due to his ambitious platform of ) and his related "Eda Vision" of socialism. The "structural reform" platform drew inspiration from the recently concluded Anpo protests against the U.S.-Japan Security Treaty, which had achieved massive size and forced the resignation of conservative prime minister Nobusuke Kishi. Eda and his allies viewed these protests as having been an unalloyed success in having allowed the JSP to play a leading role in fomenting a mass movement. Eda's "structural reform" platform called for a combination of parliamentary pressure tactics and Anpo-style extra-parliamentary mass movements that would gradually move Japan toward socialism by forcing the government into a series of piecemeal concessions. Above all, Eda and his fellow structural reformers hoped to broaden the base of the JSP beyond a hard core of labor unionists, leftist student activists, and Marxist intellectuals to encompass people from many walks of life, in order to dramatically increase the party's potential supporters at the polls.

In an effort to build popular support for his reform program, Eda announced his "New Vision of Socialism", better known by its nickname, the "Eda Vision", in July 1962. Eda declared that "[s]ocialism must be defined in sunny and cheerful terms that are easily understandable to the masses. I believe that 'socialism' is that which allows human potential to blossom to its fullest extent. The main four accomplishments that humankind has achieved so far are America's high standard of living, the Soviet Union's thoroughgoing social welfare system, England's parliamentary democracy, and Japan's peace constitution. I believe that if we can integrate these, we can give birth to a broad-based socialism."

The "Eda Vision" of a more moderate form of socialism was received enthusiastically in the mainstream Japanese press, polled well in public opinion polls. The "Eda Vision" was the final straw for the more orthodox Marxist left-wing factions in the JSP, who had already chafed against the moderate tone of Eda's "structural reform" platform. In particular, they could not accept praise of what they viewed as the "imperialist" United States and Great Britain, and the "deviationist" and "Stalinist" Soviet Union. At the 22nd Party Congress in November 1962, the left-wing of the JSP revolted, and succeeded in persuading a majority of party members present to adopt an "Eda Vision Criticism Resolution" that renounced the "Eda Vision" as antithetical to core party principles. Eda was forced to resign his position as Secretary General, and thereafter the party returned to a more dogmatically Marxist platform which emphasized the urban working classes as the party's main political base.

Thereafter, a younger generation of reform-minded activists became disillusioned and began to drift away from the party. At the same time, the emergence of the "Clean Government Party" (Kōmeitō, the political wing of the Sokka Gakkai Buddhist religious movement) and the increasing electoral success of the Japan Communist Party, began to eat away at the JSP's urban working class base. The Socialists slipped in the polls in the 1967 election, lost more ground in the 1968 Upper House election, and suffered a crushing repudiation in 1969, when they lost 51 seats in the National Diet.

1970s
In some regions, the party continued to perform well at the local level and by the 1970s many areas were run by JSP (or JSP-backed) mayors and governors, who supported environmental protection initiatives and introduced new social welfare programs.

Meanwhile, Saburō Eda continued his efforts to reform the party and expand its base. Eda ran numerous times for the post of party chairman, but was unsuccessful, although he did serve a second stint as Secretary General from 1968 to 1970.  Nevertheless, Eda remained popular among the broader Japanese public and in the mid-1970s conservative prime minister Kakuei Tanaka said at a press conference, "If the Japan Socialist Party were ever to make Eda its Chairman again, a general election would be terrifying. They would drastically expand their seats in the Diet." Eda could never overcome the undying animosity his "Eda Vision" had won him from his party's left-wing.

In 1976, Eda lost his reelection bid and was booted from the Diet. Blaming his loss on his party's dogmatic, doctrinaire Marxism and desperate for reform, he attempted to resign from the JSP but the party refused to accept his resignation and voted to expel him instead. The following year, Eda and Hideo Den led a small group of JSP Dietmembers to split from the JSP and form a new party called the Socialist Democratic Federation.

1980s 
In July 1986, under party chairman Masashi Ishibashi, the JSP suffered a disastrous double defeat in both houses of the National Diet in the simultaneously held 1986 Japanese general election and 1986 Japanese House of Councillors election. Losing in a rout to the Liberal Democratic Party (LDP) under popular prime minister Yasuhiro Nakasone, the JSP's seats in the lower house fell from 112 to a new all-time low of 85 and its share of the popular vote dropped from 19.5 percent to 17.2 percent. This defeat led the party to elect Takako Doi as party chair, making her the first woman to ever lead a Japanese political party. Doi was popular with the Japanese public led the JSP to an electoral comeback with an impressive showing in the 1990 Japanese general election, winning 136 seats and 24.4 percent of the vote. Some electoral districts had more than one successful socialist candidate. Doi's decision to put up more than one candidate for each of the 130 districts represented a controversial break with the past because unlike their LDP counterparts many party candidates did not want to run against each other; however, the great majority of the 149 socialist candidates who ran were successful, including seven of eight women.

Doi, a university professor of constitutional law before entering politics, had a tough, straight-talking manner that appealed to voters tired of the evasiveness of other politicians. Many women found her a refreshing alternative to submissive female stereotypes and in the late 1980s the public at large in opinion polls voted her their favorite politician (the runner-up in these surveys was equally tough-talking conservative LDP member Shintarō Ishihara); however, Doi's popularity was of limited aid to the party, as the powerful Shakaishugi Kyokai (Japan Socialist Association), which was supported by a contingent of the party's 76,000-strong membership, remained committed to orthodox Marxism, impeding Doi's efforts to promote what she called perestroika and a more moderate program with greater voter appeal.

In 1983, Doi's predecessor as chairman Masashi Ishibashi had begun the delicate process of moving the party away from its strong opposition to the Self-Defense Forces. While maintaining that these forces were unconstitutional in light of Article 9, he claimed that because they had been established through legal procedures, they had a legitimate status (this phrasing was changed a year later to say that the Self-Defense Forces exist legally). Ishibashi also broke past precedent by visiting Washington to talk with United States political leaders. By the end of the decade, the party had accepted the Self-Defense Forces and the 1960 U.S.-Japan Security Treaty. It advocated strict limitations on military spending (no more than 1 percent of GNP annually), a suspension of joint military exercises with United States forces, and a reaffirmation of the three non-nuclear principles (no production, possession, or introduction of nuclear weapons into Japanese territory).

Doi expressed support for balanced ties with the Democratic People's Republic of Korea (North Korea) and the Republic of Korea (South Korea). In the past, the party had favored the Kim Il-sung regime in Pyongyang and in the early 1990s it still refused to recognize the normalization of relations between Tokyo and Seoul with Treaty on Basic Relations between Japan and the Republic of Korea (1965). In domestic policy, the party demanded the continued protection of agriculture and small business in the face of foreign pressure, abolition of the consumption tax and an end to the construction and use of nuclear power reactors. As a symbolic gesture to reflect its new moderation, the party dropped its commitment to socialist revolution at its April 1990 convention and described its goal as social democracy, the creation of a society in which "all people fairly enjoy the fruits of technological advancement and modern civilization and receive the benefits of social welfare." Delegates also elected Doi to a third term as party chairwoman.

Because of the party's self-definition as a class-based party and its symbiotic relationship with the General Council of Trade Unions of Japan, the public-sector workers' confederation, few efforts were made to attract non-union constituencies. Although some  unions supported the Japanese Communist Party, the party remained the representative of Sohyo's political interests until the merger with private-sector unions and the Japanese Trade Union Confederation in 1989. Because of declining union financial support during the 1980s, some party Diet members turned to dubious fund-raising methods. One was involved in the Recruit affair. Like other parties, it sold large blocks of fund-raising party tickets and the LDP even gave individual party Diet members funds from time to time to persuade them to cooperate in passing difficult legislation.

1990s 

As part of the fallout of the Recruit Scandal, the party secured a mere 70 seats (down from 137) in the 1993 Japanese general election while the LDP lost its majority in the lower house for the first time since the 1983 Japanese general election and was out of government for the first time in 38 years. The anti-LDP coalition government of Morihiro Hosokawa was formed by reformists who had triggered the 1993 election by leaving the LDP (Japan Renewal Party and New Party Sakigake), a liberal party formed only a year before (Japan New Party), the traditional centre-left opposition (Kōmeitō, Democratic Socialist Party and Socialist Democratic Federation) and the Democratic Reform Party, the political arm of the  trade union federation, together with the JSP. In 1994, the JSP and the New Sakigake Party decided to leave the non-LDP coalition. The minority Hata cabinet lasted only a few weeks.

The JSP then formed a grand coalition (dai-renritsu) government with the LDP and the New Party Sakigake under JSP Prime Minister Tomiichi Murayama, who was leader of the party from 1993 to 1996. Most of the other parties from the anti-LDP coalition, now forced back into opposition, united to form the New Frontier Party (NFP), which overtook the JSP as second largest political party in Japan. The JSP suffered a defeat in the 1995 Japanese House of Councillors election. In January 1996, the New Socialist Party of Japan split off from the JSP, Murayama resigned as Prime Minister, and the JSP changed its name from the JSP to the Social Democratic Party (SDP) as an interim party for forming a new party.

Ideology  
The JSP is generally regarded as a progressive and socialist "left-wing" party that opposes the conservative and nationalist "right-wing" Liberal Democratic Party (LDP). The JSP is also considered a centre-left party, but there was a far-left faction within the party. The so-called "leftists" in the JSP were Marxists in favour of scientific socialism. By contrast, the so-called "rightists" were in favour of social democracy and aimed at establishing a welfare state.

The JSP supported a neutralist foreign policy and opposed amending the Constitution of Japan, especially the Article 9 of the Constitution of Japan. Japan's left-wing liberalism emerged as a "peace movement" and was largely led by the JSP.

After Takako Doi became party leader, the JSP established a European-style democratic socialism line. Apart from the party's socialist identity, the Murayama Cabinet, which came to power between 1994 and 1996, supported social-liberal reform.

The JSP opposed Shintoist social conservatism, and was politically friendly with Christianity in the United States. There were quite a few Christians in the JSP. Former Japanese Prime Minister Tetsu Katayama was also a Christian.

Leaders

Election results

General election results

Councillors election results

See also 
 List of political parties in Japan

References

Citations

Bibliography 

 
 

1945 establishments in Japan
1996 disestablishments in Japan
Christianity in Japan
Defunct political parties in Japan
Defunct social democratic parties
Defunct socialist parties in Asia
Democratic socialist parties in Asia
Former member parties of the Socialist International
Left-wing parties in Japan
Pacifism in Japan
Political parties disestablished in 1996
Political parties established in 1945
Progressive parties in Japan
Social democratic parties in Japan
Socialism in Japan
Socialist parties in Japan